The National Statistics and Census Institute (INEC) is the Panamanian government agency responsible for the collection and processing of statistical data, such as census data.

External links
 Official website

Demographics of Panama
Economy of Panama
Government of Panama
Panama